Leonard Peter Supulski (December 15, 1920 – August 31, 1943) was an American football end in the National Football League (NFL) for the Philadelphia Eagles.

Early life
Supulski was born in Kingston, Pennsylvania, and attended Kingston High School. He was one of the 12 children of a Lithuanian father and mother of Lithuanian descent.

Football career
Supulski attended and played college football at Dickinson College, but failed to graduate.  He caught 48 for 586 yards in 1941, a school record that stood until 1984, and was a United Press International All-Eastern first-team choice.  In , Supulski played in six games for the Philadelphia Eagles of the National Football League, scoring on a 41-yard touchdown reception in the season opener against the Pittsburgh Steelers.

Supulski was inducted into the Dickinson Hall of Fame in 1981.

Military career and death
At the end of the 1942 season, Supulski entered the United States Army Air Forces. After completing flight navigator training, he received his pilot qualifications on July 24, 1943. He reported to the 582nd Bomb Squadron for advanced training at Kearney Air Force Base in Nebraska to prepare for service in World War II.

On August 31, Supulski was killed along with seven others in the crash of a Boeing B-17 Flying Fortress bomber near Kearney, Nebraska, during a training flight after the aircraft caught fire and exploded upon impact with the ground.

Four of his brothers were also in the military: Edward was also in the Army Air Forces, while Raymond was part of the Navy, and Ernest and Sam served with the Army.

References

External links

 

1920 births
1943 deaths
American football ends
Dickinson Red Devils football players
Philadelphia Eagles players
United States Army Air Forces personnel killed in World War II
United States Army Air Forces officers
People from Kingston, Pennsylvania
Players of American football from Pennsylvania
Accidental deaths in Nebraska
Aviators killed in aviation accidents or incidents in the United States
Victims of aviation accidents or incidents in 1943
Military personnel from Pennsylvania